"Old Pine" is a song by British singer-songwriter Ben Howard from his debut studio album Every Kingdom. The song was written by Howard and produced by Chris Bond. It is the music video version of the original found on Howard's Old Pine EP.

A remix of the song by Everything Everything was released by Howard as a single in the United Kingdom on 20 July 2012 as a digital download with cover art designed by Owen Tozer. It features in the Sky1 TV series Starlings.

Music video
The music video for "Old Pine" was filmed in Co. Clare, Ireland. It was released on YouTube on 7 April 2011, to accompany the release of Old Pine EP, at a total length of five minutes and twenty-seven seconds. The video is also included on the deluxe edition of the studio album Every Kingdom.

Track listing

Certifications

Release history

References

2012 singles
Ben Howard songs
2011 songs
Island Records singles
Songs written by Ben Howard